The men's pole vault at the 1958 European Athletics Championships was held in Stockholm, Sweden, at Stockholms Olympiastadion on 21 and 22 August 1958.

Medalists

Results

Final
22 August

Qualification
21 August

Participation
According to an unofficial count, 26 athletes from 16 countries participated in the event.

 (1)
 (2)
 (1)
 (2)
 (2)
 (2)
 (2)
 (1)
 (2)
 (1)
 (1)
 (2)
 (2)
 (2)
 (1)
 (2)

References

Pole vault
Pole vault at the European Athletics Championships